Milan Blagojević - Namenska is a Serbian chemical manufacturing company, specialized for defence industry. It was founded in 1949 and has headquarters in Lučani, Serbia. With around 1,300 employees, it is the largest enterprise in Lučani and one of the largest in Moravica District.

Name
The company is named after famous Yugoslav Partisan Milan Blagojević Španac who is credited for initiating the anti-fascist struggle in Yugoslavia during World War II.

History
The company was founded in 1949 by the Yugoslav government. During the 1990s, company has deteriorated due to the Yugoslav Wars and sanctions imposed on Serbia and Montenegro.

According to the company's management, from 2001 to 2017, the company has invested more than 50 million euros in modernization of technological processes, measures of protection at work and fire protection. However, in 2017 two consecutive fires broke out, injuring four workers of whom two had died of large burns.

As of 2017, Milan Blagojević - Namenska is one of the largest defence industry companies of Serbia, exporting more than 90% of its products. The Government of Serbia invested 4.4 million euros in 2017 for factory's hall renovation.

Products
The company offers a variety of products for defence industry. It manufactures nitrocellulose, nitroglycerin, ball powders and dynamite applications. The notable products are:
 shot shell, rifle, and pistol and revolver powders,
 double base powders,
 military powders, such as aircraft and antiaircraft, mortar shells, mortar shells-extend range, artillery ammunition, ignition powder, and grenade launchers,
 conventional powder charges,
 sport and other special powders.

The company also provides combustible components and increment containers for mortar ammunition. Apart for military purposes, it offers products for civil consumers. Celluloid is manufactured for use in furniture and interior decoration, drawing and writing accessories, music instruments, toys, sport equipment, and optic accessories. In addition, it offers consulting, modernization of process technology, design and engineering, transfer of technology, and training personnel services.

Accidents
In 1997 accident, eight employees were killed when the fire broke out in company's facilities. On 21 September 2011, one employee was injured after minor fire in the production hall. On 25 June 2012, one employee was hurt after rocket fuel explosion on a production line.

On 14 July 2017, fire broke out in one department of the factory, and two employees got life-threatening burns. The cause of fire was unsafe transport of goods (i.e. gunpowder) due to lacking protection measures of the company. Both employees, Milomir Milivojević and Milojko Ignjatović, later passed away due to large burns. On 2 August 2017, another fire broke out, hurting two employees, of which one had 35% of the body covered in burns. Following the accidents, the Prime Minister of Serbia Ana Brnabić and the Minister of Defence Aleksandar Vulin stated that the Government will continue to invest in factory's safety, but that "accidents will continue to happen until the full process automation is reached". From 1995 until 2017, a total of 18 employees were killed in various accidents in production facilities of Milan Blagojević - Namenska.

On 17 January 2018, another fire broke out while the employees were cleaning the precipitator of nitrocellulose, hurting two of them. On 10 October 2018, another employee was injured after minor explosion.

See also
 Defense industry of Serbia

References

External links
 
 Srpski barut svetski brend at politika.rs 

1949 establishments in Serbia
Chemical companies established in 1949
Companies based in Lučani
Defense companies of Serbia
Defense industry of Serbia
Government-owned companies of Serbia
Serbian brands